Wes Hamilton (born April 24, 1953 in Texas City, Texas) is a former American football offensive lineman who was drafted by the Minnesota Vikings in the 3rd round in the 1976 NFL Draft. He played college football at the University of Tulsa. One of Wes's sons, Ben Hamilton is an offensive lineman, who currently plays for the Seattle Seahawks. His life after football includes his successful career as a small business owner of an Allegra Marketing, Print & Mail franchise in the Minneapolis suburbs. He resides nearby with his college sweetheart, Linda. He is active in his church and is involved with charitable work.

References

1953 births
Living people
People from Houston
Players of American football from Texas
American football offensive guards
Tulsa Golden Hurricane football players
Minnesota Vikings players
Homewood-Flossmoor High School alumni